Aviv (sometimes Aviv PDX) was a Middle Eastern and vegan restaurant with multiple locations in Portland, Oregon, in the United States. Guy Fieri visited the restaurant for a 2020 episode of the Food Network's Diners, Drive-Ins and Dives. Aviv garnered a positive reception and closed in 2021, during the COVID-19 pandemic.

Description
Aviv was the "only vegan Israeli restaurant in Portland" as of 2018. The plant-based menu included baba ghanoush, falafel, Gonzo shawarma fries, eight varieties of hummus, labneh, shakshuka, tahini, and spiced Moroccan-style carrots with harissa and tofu feta. The restaurant also served mushroom "calamari", mushroom couscous, and jackfruit brisket. Shakshuka was a weekend brunch option, as of 2020.

History
Following a successful run as a pop-up, Aviv was established by owners Tal Caspi and Suzanne Prinsen in partnership with Sanjay Chandrasekaran. The original brick and mortar restaurant opened on Southeast Division in May 2017, in the space previously occupied by Chandrasekaran's Heart Bar in southeast Portland's Hosford-Abernethy neighborhood. In early 2020, Guy Fieri visited the restaurant for an episode of the Food Network's Diners, Drive-Ins and Dives (season 31, episode 11: "Hometown Inspiration").

COVID-19 pandemic and closure
During the COVID-19 pandemic, Aviv operated via take-out and delivery at times. The restaurant also carried Be Sweet ice cream from Tal Caspi's shop which closed during the pandemic. For Hanukkah in 2020, Aviv's special menu included matzah ball soup, jackfruit brisket on matzo, grilled cheese latke, and challah.

The restaurant was one of a few targeted with "Free Palestine" graffiti in January 2021. By May 2021, Aviv had moved out of the Southeast Division space and was operating from spaces in northwest Portland's Pearl District and on Killingsworth Street in northeast Portland's Vernon neighborhood. In August, another location called Tiny Aviv opened on Madison Street in southeast Portland's Buckman neighborhood.

On September 23, 2021, Eater Portland confirmed plans for all locations to close; the restaurants on Killingsworth and Madison closed immediately and the Pearl District restaurant continued operating through the end of the month. The restaurant's owners said on social media: 

The Pearl District restaurant became the fourth location of The Sudra, a chain of "Indian and fusion vegan" restaurants.

Reception

Michael Russell included Aviv in The Oregonian's list of "Portland's 50 most notable restaurant openings of 2017" and "ultimate guide" to the city's 40 best brunches in 2019. In 2017, the business was nominated in the Vegetarian/Vegan Restaurant of the Year category of Eater Portland annual Eater Awards. In 2021, Waz Wu included Aviv in Eater Portland list of Portland's 15 "essential" vegan and vegetarian restaurants.

Dan Schlegel and Alex Frane included the business in Thrillist's 2019 list of Portland's "best vegetarian and vegan-friendly restaurants". Lauren Carlos and Michelle DeVona included Aviv in the website's 2020 overview of "where to find next-level hummus in Portland". In 2021, the Portland Mercury and VegOut's Allie Mitchell included Aviv in lists of "Our Favorite Vegan Restaurants in Portland". The restaurant was also included in the Daily Hive's 2021 list of "7 of the best vegan and vegetarian restaurants in Portland".

Martin Cizmar included Aviv in Willamette Week's 2017 list of "the best restaurants on Portland's Division and Clinton Streets". In 2019, the newspaper recommended the restaurant for "hangover brunch without the bacon". Willamette Week's Shannon Gormley included Aviv in a 2019 list of the 10 "best places" in Portland for hummus, and the shawarma bowl in a 2019 list of "five cheap vegan meals that are actually good". Aviv was a runner-up in the Best Mediterranean Restaurant and Best Vegetarian/ Vegan Restaurant categories in the newspaper's annual Best of Portland readers' poll in 2020.

See also

 Impact of the COVID-19 pandemic on the restaurant industry in the United States
 List of defunct restaurants of the United States
 List of Diners, Drive-Ins and Dives episodes
 List of Middle Eastern restaurants
 List of vegetarian restaurants

References

External links

 
 Aviv at the Food Network
 , KGW (May 9, 2017)
 

2017 establishments in Oregon
2021 disestablishments in Oregon
Buckman, Portland, Oregon
Defunct Asian restaurants in Portland, Oregon
Defunct Middle Eastern restaurants
Defunct vegan restaurants
Hosford-Abernethy, Portland, Oregon
Middle Eastern restaurants in the United States
Middle Eastern-American culture in Portland, Oregon
Pearl District, Portland, Oregon
Restaurants disestablished during the COVID-19 pandemic
Restaurants disestablished in 2021
Restaurants established in 2017
Vegan restaurants in Oregon
Vernon, Portland, Oregon